The Oceania Rugby Men's Championship (formerly known as the Oceania Cup) is an international rugby union competition for countries and territories from Oceania with national teams in the developmental band. It is administered by Oceania Rugby.

The tournament has been played under various formats depending on the number and strength of the teams entered. The first competition was held in 1996-97 as part of the qualification process for the 1999 Rugby World Cup.

The competition was officially re-launched as the FORU Oceania Cup for the 2007 season. From 2009 onward, it has been held bi-annually and it has been played under a round robin format since 2011, with the title awarded to the leading team on the ladder after all matches are completed. 

The 2009 champions were Papua New Guinea, who defeated the Cook Islands 29-21 in the final. Papua New Guinea retained their title in 2011, winning the round-robin tournament over Vanuatu, Solomon Islands and Niue.

Cook Islands defeated Papua New Guinea 37-31 on the final day of the 2013 tournament, winning the tournament from the defending champions, with Solomon Islands third, and Tahiti fourth. The Cook Islands did not compete in 2015, and Papua New Guinea claimed their fourth title with Tahiti finishing as runner-up.

Teams
Competing nations in the Oceania Rugby Cup are:

Note: The Tier 1 and 2 teams from Oceania (Australia, Fiji, New Zealand, Samoa, and Tonga) do not participate in the Oceania Rugby Cup.

Summary
Winners and runners-up for official FORU and IRB (WR) developmental tournaments in Oceania:

Notes:
 Part of the Rugby World Cup qualification process.
 The final of the 2007 tournament was not held until April 2008. Starting from 2009, the tournament has been held biennially.

See also
 Pacific Nations Cup
 Pacific Rugby Challenge
 Oceania Sevens
 Oceania Women's Sevens Championship
 Oceania Under 20 Rugby Championship

Notes and references

External links
 Official Website

  
Rugby union competitions in Oceania for national teams
Recurring sporting events established in 2006